Blue Springs Village is an unincorporated community in Brush Creek Township in northeastern Washington County, Arkansas, United States. The community is located east of Springdale, just north of U.S. Route 412 on the west bank of Beaver Lake.

References

 Payton Alan Ellison lives here

Unincorporated communities in Washington County, Arkansas
Unincorporated communities in Arkansas